Misheh Kisheh (also Romanized as Mīsheh Kisheh) is a village in Kakavand-e Gharbi Rural District, Kakavand District, Delfan County, Lorestan Province, Iran. At the 2006 census, its population was 43, in five families.

The literal translation of Misheh Kisheh is "Gets Closer".

References 

Towns and villages in Delfan County